The Public Service Alliance of Canada Building is a modernist elliptical office building in Ottawa, Ontario, constructed in 1968 as the national headquarters for the Public Service Alliance of Canada. Designed by Paul Schoeler of Schoeler & Heaton Architects, the 12-storey building is located at the intersection of Gilmour and Metcalfe. The building was a recipient of a Ontario Association of Architects Award. In 2000, the Royal Architectural Institute of Canada chose the building as one of the top 500 buildings produced in Canada during the last millennium.

References 

Office buildings completed in 1968
Modernist architecture in Canada
Buildings and structures in Ottawa
Headquarters in Canada
Public Service Alliance of Canada